Lactarius paradoxus is a member of the large milk-cap genus Lactarius in the order Russulales. It was first described in 1940.
It is found in the eastern and southern United States, and is mycorrhizal with pine and oak.  When damaged, it bleeds red latex.
The cap has a blue-green to gray color.

Habitat
The species can be found under pines, fruiting from early fall to late winter.

Edibility
The species is edible and mild, but bitter if too old.

Similar-looking species
Lactarius indigo looks similar, but with a blue latex. Lactarius rubrilacteus has a reddish latex and does not appear blue.

See also
List of Lactarius species

References

External links

Lactarius paradoxus @ Morel Mushroom Hunting Club

paradoxus
Edible fungi
Fungi described in 1940